Zaban-e Zanan (English meaning: Women's Voice) was a radical women's periodical, published in Iran from 18 July 1919 until 1 January 1921, and edited by activist Sediqeh Dowlatabadi.

History and profile
In 1919 teacher and activist Sediqeh Dowlatabadi founded the magazine Zaban-e Zanan. It was the third women's magazine to be published in Iran, and the first to be published outside Tehran - it was published in Isfahan. It was preceded by: Danesh (Knowledge) published from 1910; Shokufeh (Blossom) published from 1913. The first issue was published on 18 July 1919 and started as a bi-weekly periodical. Each issue was four pages long. However, due to demand it moved to weekly publication. It only published submissions from women and girls. The magazine was forced to close on 1 January 1921, due to its anti-British stance.

Reception
From the outset, Dowlatabadi set out to create articles which would challenge "backwardness and feeble-mindedness" surrounding women's rights in Isfahan. The publication explicitly advocated for 'Unveiling' of women in Iran. As a result of this stance, the publication was attacked in other news outlets, and the premises were physically attacked with stones and with firearms. The magazine ended up being produced under police protection. Two years after its publication, it was banned for 13 months due to the explicitly anticolonial editorial of Dowlatabadi.

In 1921, Dowlatabadi moved to Tehran and re-established the magazine there. This iteration was under the same name, but published as a monthly 48-page magazine. This second edition was influential and gives insight into the lives of women in Iran across several decades.

Legacy
In 2016, Zaban-e Zanan and Dowlatabadi's archives were the subject of an exhibition curated by Azadeh Fatehrad.

References

External links
 

1919 establishments in Iran
1921 disestablishments in Iran
Biweekly magazines
Defunct magazines published in Iran
Magazines established in 1919
Magazines disestablished in 1921

Weekly magazines published in Iran
Women's magazines published in Iran